"Tuff" is a song written and performed by Ace Cannon, and was arranged and produced by Carl McVoy. It was featured on his 1962 album Tuff-Sax.

Chart performance 
It reached #3 on the U.S. R&B chart and #17 on the U.S. pop chart in 1962.  The song ranked #40 on Billboard magazine's Top 100 singles of 1962.

Other versions
Billy Vaughn and His Orchestra released a version of the song on their 1962 album Chapel by the Sea.
Fausto Papetti released a version of the song on his 1965 album 3a Raccolta.
Boots Randolph released a version of the song on his 1965 album Plays 12 Monstrous Sax Hits!
Ray Anthony released a version of the song on his 1968 album Ray Anthony Now.
Charlie Musselwhite released a version of the song on his 1979 album The Harmonica According to Charlie Musselwhite.
Hank Crawford and Jimmy McGriff released a version of the song on their 1990 album On the Blue Side.
Clifford Scott released a version of the song on his 1992 album Mr. Honky Tonk Is Back in Town.
John Fahey and Cul de Sac released a version of the song on their 1997 album The Epiphany of Glenn Jones.

References

1961 songs
1961 singles
Hi Records singles
1960s instrumentals